Torgny Georg Erik Otto Wåhlander (born 15 November 1935) is a retired Swedish long jumper who competed at the 1956 Summer Olympics. He won the national title in 1955, 1956, 1958–60 and 1962, setting a national record in 1960.

References

1935 births
Living people
Swedish male long jumpers
Olympic athletes of Sweden
Athletes (track and field) at the 1956 Summer Olympics
Athletes from Stockholm
20th-century Swedish people